Andreas Fransson (15 April 1983 – 29 September 2014) was a Swedish extreme skier perhaps best known for his having made descents of the hitherto un-skied specific faces of mountains. Among his inaugural descents was that of the south face of Denali in Alaska during the spring of 2011.

Fransson died alongside JP Auclair in an avalanche on 29 September 2014 on Monte San Lorenzo in Aysen, Chile while filming for the webisode series Apogee Skiing.

References

External links
Fransson's website
Tempting Fear (film)

Extreme skiers
Swedish male alpine skiers
1983 births
2014 deaths
Deaths in avalanches
Sport deaths in Chile